A one-off is something made or occurring only once, independent of any pattern.  It may also refer to:

 One-off housing, individual houses built outside of towns and villages
 One-off vehicle, a vehicle that was manufactured only once
 One Off (miniseries), a video animation by Junichi Sato
 One Offs... Remixes & B-Sides, a 2002 compilation album by British musician Bonobo

See also
 One and Done EP (album)
 One-shot (comics), a pilot or a stand-alone story created as a single issue rather than part of a series
 Standalone (disambiguation), something sufficient on its own or unique to itself